Walter Intemann (11 December 1944 – 7 January 2023) was a Swiss-born Austrian businessman and politician.

Intemann died in Dornbirn on 7 January 2023, at the age of 78.

References

1944 births
2023 deaths
20th-century Austrian businesspeople
21st-century Austrian businesspeople
Austrian People's Party politicians
Members of the Landtag of Vorarlberg
Swiss emigrants to Austria
People from St. Gallen (city)